The Karate Kid Part II is a 1986 American martial arts drama film written by Robert Mark Kamen and directed by John G. Avildsen. It is the second installment in the Karate Kid franchise and the sequel to the 1984 film The Karate Kid, starring Ralph Macchio and Pat Morita. The Karate Kid Part II follows Daniel LaRusso (Macchio), who accompanies his karate teacher Mr. Miyagi (Morita) to see his dying father in Okinawa, only to encounter an old friend-turned-rival with a long-harbored grudge against Miyagi.

Following the success of the first installment, preparation for a sequel began immediately. Upon completion of the final script, Macchio and Morita were re-signed and additional casting took place between May and July 1985. Principal photography began in September in Los Angeles, and filming completed in December. Locations included Oahu, which was used to represent Okinawa in the film.

The Karate Kid Part II was theatrically released in the United States on June 20, 1986. The film received mixed reviews, with critics praising Morita's performance as well as the new location and characters, while others criticized elements of the storyline, the antagonists, and some of the action scenes. The film was a commercial success, grossing  worldwide, making it one of the highest-grossing films of 1986. A sequel titled The Karate Kid Part III was released in 1989.

Plot

Shortly after his dojo's loss in the 1984 All-Valley Karate Tournament, a furious John Kreese attacks his student, Johnny Lawrence, in the parking lot. Miyagi intervenes and passively immobilizes Kreese. He threatens a deadly blow but instead comically tweaks Kreese's nose and walks away. Johnny and his friends leave a humiliated Kreese and Cobra Kai behind. 

Six months later, Daniel and Ali have ended their relationship, and Daniel lives with Miyagi after his mother accepted a job in Fresno. Miyagi receives a letter notifying him that his father is dying, prompting him to return to his home village on Okinawa Island. He tells Daniel that many years ago, he fell in love with a woman named Yukie. She was arranged to marry his best friend Sato, son of the wealthiest man in the village and fellow karate student of his father. Upon announcing his intentions to marry Yukie, Sato challenged him to a fight to the death. Rather than fight, however, Miyagi left the country. Daniel decides to accompany him back to Okinawa.

Upon arrival, Miyagi and Daniel are greeted by Chozen Toguchi, who drives Miyagi and Daniel to one of Sato's warehouses and reveals he is Sato's nephew. Sato appears and demands to fight Miyagi, who adamantly refuses. Arriving at the village, Miyagi and Daniel are welcomed by Yukie and her niece Kumiko. They discover that Sato has become a rich industrialist whose supertrawlers have destroyed the local fish population, impoverishing the other villagers. They are forced to rent property from Sato, who owns the village's land title. Yukie reveals that she never married Sato because of her love for Miyagi.

Miyagi's father dies, and Sato gives him three days to mourn out of respect before their fight. Miyagi shows Daniel the secret to his family's karate – a handheld drum that twists back and forth, illustrating the "drum technique", a counter-striking karate move that Daniel begins to practice. Daniel and Kumiko begin to develop a romance.

Daniel unintentionally exposes corruption in Chozen's grocery business during an encounter in the village. Chozen accuses Daniel of insulting his honor, and they have a series of confrontations. The feud escalates when Chozen and his cronies attack Daniel and vandalize Miyagi's family property, but Miyagi fends them off. He and Daniel plan to return home before the situation worsens, but Sato threatens to destroy the village if Miyagi refuses to fight. Miyagi finally agrees on the condition that Sato relinquishes land ownership to the villagers, describing it as a "small price" to pay for honor; Sato reluctantly agrees.

On the day of the fight, a typhoon strikes the village forcing everyone to take shelter. Sato's dojo collapses, leaving him trapped in the wreckage. Miyagi and Daniel rush to rescue him, and Daniel later ventures back out to save a child trapped in a nearby bell tower. Sato orders Chozen to help, but when he refuses, Sato rushes to assist Daniel himself. He publicly shames his nephew and disowns him. An enraged Chozen runs off into the storm in disgrace.

The next day, Sato returns, asking for Miyagi's forgiveness. He vows to help rebuild the village and relinquish the title to the villagers. He also agrees to host the O-bon festival in a nearby ceremonial castle, inviting Daniel to join. During the celebration, a vengeful Chozen ziplines into the presentation and takes Kumiko hostage, demanding to fight Daniel to the death. Daniel fights bravely but is eventually overwhelmed by Chozen. Miyagi, Sato, and the crowd respond by twisting handheld drums in unison, inspiring Daniel to utilize the drum technique to defeat Chozen. Daniel grabs the vanquished Chozen and threatens to end his life saying, "Live or die, man?!" Chozen chooses death, but remembering how Miyagi handled Kreese earlier, Daniel instead playfully tweaks Chozen's nose and drops him to the ground. The onlookers cheer as Daniel and Kumiko embrace.

Cast

 Ralph Macchio as Daniel LaRusso
 Pat Morita as Mr. Miyagi
 Nobu McCarthy as Yukie
 Tamlyn Tomita as Kumiko
 Yuji Okumoto as Chozen Toguchi
 Danny Kamekona as Sato
 Charlie Tanimoto as Miyagi Chōjun
 Joey Miyashima as Toshio
 Marc Hayashi as Taro
Opening sequence
 Martin Kove as John Kreese
 William Zabka as Johnny Lawrence
 Tony O'Dell as Jimmy
 Ron Thomas as Bobby
 Rob Garrison as Tommy
 Chad McQueen as Dutch
 Pat E. Johnson as Referee
 Bruce Malmuth as Announcer

Other notable cast appearances include BD Wong (credited as "Bradd Wong") as an Okinawan boy who invites Daniel and Kumiko to a dance club and Clarence Gilyard as one of the participants in the ice-breaking scene. Also, Traci Toguchi, who is credited as "Girl Bell Ringer", is the child rescued by Daniel in the typhoon, and is later identified as "Yuna" in the Cobra Kai season three episode "Miyagi-Do".

Production
The opening scene takes place immediately following the finale of the first film to seamlessly tie the two together. It was originally planned as the ending for the first film, although it was not shot until after the second film's production began.

Filming
Principal photography took place in Oahu, Hawaii, in the northeastern area of the island known as the "windward side". The local countryside in modern-day Okinawa had been drastically changed due to the presence of military bases, so other locations in both Japan and Hawaii were scouted as alternative filming locations. Filmmakers selected a property in Oahu that was privately owned by a retired local physician who agreed to allow a portion of the land to be used in the film. To form the Okinawan village portrayed in the film, seven authentic replicas of Okinawan houses were constructed along with more than three acres of planted crops. Fifty Okinawa-born Hawaii residents were also recruited as film extras. Filming began on September 23, 1985, and ended on December 20.

Music
The musical score for The Karate Kid Part II was composed by Bill Conti, who wrote the score for the previous installment, and is the only one of the trilogy not to feature the pan flute of Gheorghe Zamfir (a decision the composer regretted, according to the anniversary album liner notes). The film's signature tune was Peter Cetera's song "Glory of Love", which was a No. 1 hit in the United States and received an Academy Award nomination for Best Song. When Daniel and Miyagi are being driven by Chozen and his crony Toshio after they arrive in Okinawa, Chozen tunes in the radio of the car until he reaches a station playing "Fascination", the same song to which Ali and Johnny were slow dancing at the high-end country club in the original film. The soundtrack is notable as being the final album released by United Artists Records.

 "Glory of Love" (Peter Cetera)
 "Rock 'n' Roll Over You" (The Moody Blues)
 "Fish for Life" (Mancrab)
 "Rock Around the Clock" (Paul Rodgers)
 "Let Me at 'Em" (Southside Johnny)
 "This Is the Time" (Dennis DeYoung)
 "Earth Angel" (New Edition)
 "Love Theme from The Karate Kid Part II" (Bill Conti)
 "Two Looking at One" (Carly Simon)
 "The Storm" (Bill Conti)

Charts

Reception

Box office
The Karate Kid Part II opened in 1,323 theaters across North America on June 20, 1986. In its opening weekend, the film ranked first in its domestic box office grossing $12,652,336 with an average of $9,563 per theater. The film earned $20,014,510 in its opening week and ended its run earning a total of $115,103,979 domestically.

In the United Kingdom, the film grossed £2,313,517 at the box office. The film grossed a total of  worldwide, matching the box office total of the original film.

In terms of box office admissions, the film sold 31,025,300 tickets in the United States. It also sold 2,625,169 tickets in France and Germany, and 2,518,483 tickets in Spain and Sweden, adding up to at least 36,168,952 tickets sold in the United States and Mainland Europe.

Critical response
The film had a mixed response from critics. At the review aggregator website Rotten Tomatoes, it holds a 44% approval rating, with an average score of 5.00 out of 10 based on 32 reviews. The website's critical consensus reads: "Like countless sequels, The Karate Kid Part II tries upping the stakes without straying too far from formula -- and suffers diminishing returns as a result". Metacritic, which uses a weighted average, assigned the season a score of 55 out of 100 based on 9 critics, indicating "mixed or average reviews".

Movie-gazette.com gave the film a positive review, stating the film was a "worthy follow-up to the first Karate Kid film, with added interest provided by its exotic locations and characters". The Los Angeles Times also gave the film a positive review, particularly praising Pat Morita's performance as Miyagi and calling the actor "the heart of the movie". Film historian Leonard Maltin agreed with the strength of the performances, but called the film "purposeless... corny in the extreme — all that's missing from the climax is hounds and ice floes — but made palatable by winning performances. Best for kids". At the Movies gave the film a mixed review, with both critics praising the character Miyagi but criticizing the villains and action scenes. Roger Ebert recommended the movie overall but Gene Siskel did not.

Accolades

At the 1987 ASCAP Awards, Bill Conti won Top Box Office Films for the original music, which was released on United Artists Records. It also received an Academy Award nomination for Best Original Song for "Glory of Love".

Video games
A video game adaptation titled The Karate Kid Part II: The Computer Game was released in 1987 by publisher Microdeal on Atari ST and Amiga. It is a fighting game in which the user plays the role of Daniel in fights based on movie scenes. There are also two bonus levels with digitized images from the movie: Miyagi catching flies with chopsticks and Daniel breaking an ice block.

The 1987 Nintendo Entertainment System video game The Karate Kid includes several elements based on The Karate Kid Part II. Stages 2–4 of the game are based on The Karate Kid Part II, as are two bonus games in which the player must break up to six ice blocks. The drum technique exercise shown in the movie is also featured as a challenge in which the gamer must dodge the swinging axe as many times as possible.

References

External links

Original trailer
 
 
 
 
"The Karate Kid" 30th Anniversary Panel Discussion, Q+A—sponsored by the Japanese American National Museum, Los Angeles, September 9, 2014.
30 YEARS AGO, THE KARATE KID, PART II TOOK US FROM THE VALLEY TO "OKINAWA" - LA Weekly, June 16, 2016.
The Karate Kid and Cobra Kai - Reunited Apart, December 21, 2020

1986 films
1986 martial arts films
1980s teen drama films
1980s action drama films
American coming-of-age films
American martial arts films
American sequel films
American teen drama films
Columbia Pictures films
1980s English-language films
Films about bullying
Films directed by John G. Avildsen
Films scored by Bill Conti
Films set in Los Angeles
Films set in Okinawa Prefecture
Films set in Japan
Films set in the San Fernando Valley
Films shot in Hawaii
Films shot in Los Angeles
Films set in 1984
Films set in 1985
Films with screenplays by Robert Mark Kamen
Martial arts tournament films
Karate films
The Karate Kid (franchise) films
1980s coming-of-age films
1986 drama films
Japan in non-Japanese culture
1980s American films